Arthur B. "Chip" Sansom III (born July 4, 1951) is an American comic strip cartoonist.

Sansom attended Kenyon College, where he was a member of Delta Kappa Epsilon fraternity.  He graduated from Case Western Reserve University in Cleveland, Ohio with a double major in business and English.

In 1977, he started to assist his father Art Sansom on the comic strip The Born Loser, which began publication in 1965. He took over The Born Loser comic strip in 1991 after his father Art Sansom died in 1991.

In addition, Chip Sansom also worked on the comic strip "Dusty Chaps" with his father Art Sansom in 1982–1983.

Personal life

Sansom lives in a suburb of Cleveland, Ohio with his wife Brooke and 2 daughters Isabel Sansom and Brennan Sansom.
Chip Sansom's artistic streak also lends itself to other areas of his life. He is the talented bass guitarist for the “Rockin’ Ravers,” playing the local clubs in Cleveland. Chip also supports the Ohio Literacy Network with his comics work.

Surgery

In the month of November 2021, Chip Sansom has undergone surgery and The Born Loser has been in reruns at Gocomics.

Awards
The duo received the National Cartoonists Society Reuben Award for best humor comic strip in 1987 and 1991.

Quotes

When asked about literacy

I feel very strongly about the cause of literacy and do whatever I can to promote it.

From the Youtube video 50th Anniversary interview

Hi I'm Chip Sansom in Lakewood Ohio, and I'm a cartoonist for the comic strip The Born Loser. And I'm very thrilled today, that the Born Loser was celebrated for a 50 years of being in existence and it was a great thrill for the local NCS chapter The Great Lakes chapter the National Cartoonist Society, to throw this little party for me, and for the strip and for my dad. My dad created the comic strip in 1965 and I apprenticed with him starting in 1977, and worked till he passed away in 1991 and have been doing this strip by myself ever since.

In response to The Born Loser April Fools joke on April 1, 2020

Unfortunately, it was submitted to my syndicate before things became dire. I made a decision when things got bad to keep The Born Loser characters in a virus-free world. Readers need a place they can go these days for a simple chuckle and a few moments of relief from the pain of the headlines. While this strip wasn’t written to be a reference to the virus, it can be indirectly interpreted as having been so. I am trying to avoid these type of situations with the gags I have been writing recently. Be well!

In response to undergoing unexpected surgery

As I have mentioned in previous posts, the strip is temporarily in reruns (selected by my wonderful editor), due to an unexpected surgery and subsequent recuperation. This is no secret, as anyone who reads the strips can see the original year of publication on the copyright. I will be back working on the strip as soon as my doctors clear it. In the meantime, I will continue to interact with my readers whenever possible through the daily comments on GoComics.

References

External links
NCS Awards

1951 births
Living people
American comic strip cartoonists
Artists from Cleveland
Case Western Reserve University alumni
Kenyon College alumni